K39 may refer to:
 15 cm Kanone 39, a German heavy gun used in the Second World War
 Junkers K 39, a German prototype reconnaissance-bomber built 1926
 K-39 (Kansas highway), a state highway in Kansas
 Piano Concerto No. 2 (Mozart), K. 39, by Wolfgang Amadeus Mozart
 Potassium-39 (K-39 or 39K), an isotope of potassium